Fred Warren Waters (February 2, 1927 – August 28, 1989) was an American professional baseball player, manager, scout and coach. The left-handed pitcher appeared in 25 Major League games for the –56 Pittsburgh Pirates. Born in  Benton, Mississippi, Waters attended the University of Southern Mississippi.

Career
Apart from his trials with the Pirates, Waters had a 13-season (1949–58; 1960–62) pitching career in minor league baseball. He was first signed by the Brooklyn Dodgers, then acquired by the  Milwaukee Braves in April 1953, spending most of that season with the Lincoln Chiefs of the Class A Western League.  Then, on December 26, 1953, he was traded to Pittsburgh along with third baseman Sid Gordon, outfielder Sam Jethroe, pitcher Max Surkont, fellow minor leaguers Curt Raydon and Larry Lasalle, and $100,000 for third baseman Danny O'Connell. This is the only six-for-one trade in Major League history and was surpassed only by the seven-for-one deal that sent Vida Blue from the Oakland Athletics to the San Francisco Giants in 1978.

Waters appeared in two games in relief for the Pirates at the end of the 1955 season, then worked in 23 games for them over the last three months of 1956 after his recall from the Open-Classification Hollywood Stars of the Pacific Coast League. Both of his MLB victories came in starting roles. His first big-league triumph came on July 26, when he went seven shutout innings against the Chicago Cubs, allowing only four singles and three bases on balls.  Howie Pollet relieved Waters in the eighth inning with two runners on base, and preserved the 4–0 shutout win.

Over his 25 Major League games and 56 innings pitched, Waters allowed 55 hits and compiled a strong 2.89 career earned run average. However, he issued 32 bases on balls, with only 14 strikeouts.

Waters appeared in only seven minor league games in 1958 and sat out the 1959 season completely.  He became a high school baseball coach in Pensacola, Florida.  But in 1960, at age 33, he returned to baseball as a pitcher-coach for the Class D Pensacola Angels of the Alabama–Florida League. In three seasons with Pensacola's professional franchise, he appeared in 73 games, largely as a starting pitcher, and compiled a 41–13 record and a sparkling 2.04 earned run average.

In 1964, Waters became a manager and coach in the farm system of the Minnesota Twins, while continuing his high school coaching duties in Pensacola. During Waters' 22 seasons as a manager, all of them in short-season leagues (Rookie and Short Season-A levels), his teams went 681–664 (.505).

Waters retired from managing after the 1986 season, and died in Pensacola three years later at the age of 62.

References

External links
, or Retrosheet

1927 births
1989 deaths
American expatriate baseball players in Mexico
American expatriate baseball players in Venezuela
Asheville Tourists players
Atlanta Crackers players
Baseball players from Mississippi
Chattanooga Lookouts players
Denver Bears players
Diablos Rojos del México players
Elmira Pioneers players
Fort Worth Cats players
Greenwood Dodgers players
Hollywood Stars players
Lincoln Chiefs players
Major League Baseball pitchers
Mexican League baseball pitchers
Minnesota Twins scouts
Minor league baseball managers
Mobile Bears players
Navegantes del Magallanes players
Newport News Dodgers players
Pensacola Angels players
Pensacola Senators players
People from Yazoo County, Mississippi
Pittsburgh Pirates players
St. Paul Saints (AA) players
Southern Miss Golden Eagles baseball players
Tigres del México players
Waco Pirates players